Nola flavicosta is a moth in the family Nolidae. It was described by Sergius G. Kiriakoff in 1958. It is found in Uganda.

References

flavicosta
Moths of Africa
Insects of Uganda
Moths described in 1958